The Eurojet EJ200 is a military low-bypass turbofan used as the powerplant of the Eurofighter Typhoon. The engine is largely based on the Rolls-Royce XG-40 technology demonstrator, which was developed in the 1980s. The EJ200 is built by the EuroJet Turbo GmbH consortium. The EJ200 is also used in the Bloodhound LSR supersonic land speed record attempting car.

Development

Rolls-Royce XG-40

Rolls-Royce began development of the XG-40 technology demonstrator engine in 1984. Development costs were met by the British government (85%) and Rolls-Royce.

On 2 August 1985, Italy, West Germany and the UK agreed to go ahead with the Eurofighter. The announcement of this agreement confirmed that France had chosen not to proceed as a member of the project. One issue was French insistence that the aircraft be powered by the SNECMA M88, in development at the same time as the XG-40.

Eurojet EJ200

The Eurojet consortium was formed in 1986 to co-ordinate and manage the project largely based on XG-40 technology. In common with the XG-40, the EJ200 has a three-stage fan with a high pressure ratio, five-stage low-aspect-ratio high-pressure (HP) compressor, a combustor using advanced cooling and thermal protection, and single-stage HP and LP turbines with powder metallurgy discs and single crystal blades. A reheat system (afterburner) provides thrust augmentation. The variable area final nozzle is a convergent-divergent design.

In December 2006, Eurojet completed deliveries of the 363 EJ200s for the Tranche 1 Eurofighters. Tranche 2 aircraft require 519 EJ200s. , Eurojet was contracted to produce a total of 1,400 engines for the Eurofighter project.

HAL Tejas

In 2009, Eurojet entered a bid, in competition with General Electric's F414, to supply a thrust vectoring variant of the EJ200 to power the HAL Tejas Mk2 after both the indigenous Kaveri engine and the General Electric F404 used in prototypes and early production models proved to have insufficient performance. After evaluation and acceptance of the technical offer provided by both Eurojet and GE Aviation, the IAF preferred the EJ200 as it lighter and more compact but after the commercial quotes were compared in detail GE Aviation was declared as the lowest bidder. A second consideration by HAL was industrial offsets, if local Eurojet engine production was set up for the Tejas it would make future Eurofighter aircraft bids to India cheaper and more competitive with the Tejas whereas it was assumed the US would not allow aircraft using the engine to be sold to India, however October 2020 Boeing offered to sell F-18 aircraft to the Indian Navy.

TAI TFX
On 20 January 2015 ASELSAN of Turkey and Eurojet Turbo GmbH signed a Memorandum of Understanding to collaborate on the EJ200 military turbofan engine programme. It is envisaged that the collaboration would produce a derivative of the EJ200 with thrust vectoring for use in Turkey's TFX 5th generation air superiority fighter programme. Eurojet EJ200 is not selected for TFX program. TFX will use General Electric F110 engine until indigenous manufactured by TRMOTOR.

Landspeed record attempt
An EJ200 engine, together with a rocket engine, will power the Bloodhound LSR for an attempt at the land speed record. The target speed is at least 1000 mph.

Variants

EJ2x0
Stage 1:
 The EJ2x0 with 20% growth compared to the original EJ200. The EJ2x0 engine will have dry thrust increasing to some 72 kN (or 16,200 lbf) with a reheated output of around 103 kN (or 23,100 lbf).
Stage 2:
 The new engine plan to increase the output 30% more power compared to the original EJ200. The engine will have dry thrust of around 78 kN (or 17,500 lbf) with a reheated output of around 120 kN (or 27,000 lbf).

Applications
 Eurofighter Typhoon
 Bloodhound LSR
 Liquid fly-back booster (Cancelled)

Specifications (EJ200)

See also

References
Notes

Footnotes

External links

 Eurojet GmbH
 Rolls-Royce EJ200
 EJ200 fact sheet
 EUROJET Offers its EJ200 Engine for the Tejas, Indian Light Combat Aircraft

Low-bypass turbofan engines
1990s turbofan engines
Eurofighter Typhoon